The 2021–22 Metro Atlantic Athletic Conference (MAAC) men's basketball season began with practices in October 2021, followed by the start of the 2021–22 NCAA Division I men's basketball season on November 9. Conference play started in December and concluded in March 2022. This was the 41st season of MAAC basketball.

The 2022 MAAC tournament was held from March 8 through March 13 at the Jim Whelan Boardwalk Hall in Atlantic City, New Jersey for the third year in a row. Saint Peter's defeated Monmouth in the championship to win the conference's automatic bid to the 2022 NCAA tournament for the first time since 2011. Saint Peter's received a No. 15 seed in the NCAA tournament East Region, and faced No. 2 seed Kentucky in the first round. They became the tenth No. 15 seed on record to upset a No. 2 seed in the NCAA tournament with a shocking 85–79 victory in overtime. Advancing to the second round, they took on No. 7 seed Murray State, winning that game 70–60, and became the third No. 15 seed to advance to the Sweet 16. At the same time, they became the first MAAC men's basketball program to ever advance to the Sweet 16 as well. In the Sweet Sixteen, Saint Peter's would become the first ever No. 15 seed to advance to the Elite Eight after beating No. 3 seed Purdue 67–64. Their magical season would come to an end in the Elite Eight, with a loss to No. 8 seed North Carolina 49–69.

This was the final MAAC season for Monmouth, which joins the Colonial Athletic Association on July 1, 2022. On May 2, 2022, it was announced that Mount St. Mary's will leave the Northeast Conference and join the MAAC, replacing Monmouth on the same date.

Head Coaches

Coaching changes 

No coaching changes occurred in the offseason.

Coaches 

Notes: 
 All records, appearances, titles, etc. are from time with current school only. 
 Year at school includes 2021–22 season.
 Overall and MAAC/NCAA records are from time at current school and are before the beginning of the 2021–22 season.
 Previous jobs are head coaching jobs unless otherwise noted.

Preseason

Preseason Coaches Poll

( ) first place votes

Preseason All-MAAC teams

† denotes unanimous selection

Preseason Player of the Year

MAAC regular season

Conference matrix
This table summarizes the final head-to-head results between teams in conference play. *Completed for 2021–2022 season*

Player of the week
Throughout the regular season, the Metro Atlantic Athletic Conference offices named player(s) of the week and rookie(s) of the week.

Records against other conferences
Records against non-conference foes for the 2021–22 season. Records shown for regular season only.

Postseason

MAAC Tournament

 2022 Metro Atlantic Athletic Conference Basketball Tournament, Jim Whelan Boardwalk Hall, Atlantic City, New Jersey

NCAA Tournament

Game summaries

First round

Second Round

East Regional semifinal

East Regional final

NCAA Tournament Awards and honors
East Region All-Tournament Team
 Daryl Banks III, Saint Peter's
 Doug Edert, Saint Peter's

National Invitation Tournament

Game summary

Honors and awards

MAAC Season Awards 

† denotes unanimous selection

All-MAAC tournament team

2021–22 Season final statistic leaders

Individual statistic NCAA Top 100 leaders
*Final 2021–22*

Scoring
 Jose Perez, Manhattan (18.9/game): 45th
 Marcus Hammond, Niagara (18.1/game): 66th

Total Points
 Jose Perez, Manhattan (567): 80th

Rebounding
 Kevin Marfo, Quinnipiac (10.2/game): 14th
 Supreme Cook, Fairfield (8.3/game): 56th
 Nelly Junior Joseph, Iona (8.2/game): 58th

Total Rebounds
 Kevin Marfo, Quinnipiac (316): 19th
 Supreme Cook, Fairfield (274): 48th
 Nelly Junior Joseph, Iona (272): 52nd

Defensive Rebounds
 Anthony Gaines, Siena (6.11/game): 46th

Offensive Rebounds
 Nelly Junior Joseph, Iona (3.27/game): 17th
 Kevin Marfo, Quinnipiac (3.10/game): 32nd
 Supreme Cook, Fairfield (2.88/game): 49th

Assists
 Dwight Murray Jr., Rider (4.7/game): 55th
 Jose Perez, Manhattan (4.3/game): 65th

Total Assists
 Dwight Murray Jr., Rider (150): 52nd
 Jose Perez, Manhattan (136): 87th

Assist Turnover Ratio
 Dylan van Eyck, Iona (2.08): 70th
 Elijah Joiner, Iona (1.98): 88th

Steals
 Dimencio Vaughn, Rider (1.9/game): 52nd

Total Steals
 Dimencio Vaughn, Rider (62): 43rd

Blocks
 KC Ndefo, Saint Peter's (2.82/game): 11th
 Nelly Junior Joseph, Iona (1.88/game): 50th

Total Blocks
 KC Ndefo, Saint Peter's (96): 7th
 Nelly Junior Joseph, Iona (62): 42nd

Minutes
 Dwight Murray Jr., Rider (37.2/game): 9th
 George Papas, Monmouth (35.1/game): 64th

Total Minutes Played
 Dwight Murray Jr., Rider (1196): 43rd
 George Papas, Monmouth (1194): 46th

Double Doubles
 Kevin Marfo, Quinnipiac (12): 26th
 Nelly Junior Joseph, Iona (11): 36th
 Supreme Cook, Fairfield (7): 95th

Field Goal Percentage (minimum avg 5 made per game)
 Jao Ituka, Marist (151–287 .5261): 59th

Total Field Goals Attempted
 Jose Perez, Manhattan (446): 67th

Free Throw Percentage (minimum avg 2.5 made per game)
 Doug Edert, Saint Peter's (86–97 .8866): 18th
 George Papas, Monmouth (108–125 .8640): 45th
 Shavar Reynolds, Monmouth (110–128 .8593): 51st
 Daryl Banks III, Saint Peter's (85–99 .8586): 52nd
 Taj Benning, Fairfield (85–101 .8416): 73rd
 Marcus Hammond, Niagara (103–124 .8308): 94th

Free Throws Made
 Jose Perez, Manhattan (182): 4th

Free Throw Attempts
 Jose Perez, Manhattan (227): 4th
 Nelly Junior Joseph, Iona (166): 74th
 KC Ndefo, Saint Peter's (162): 83rd

Three-point percentage (minimum 1.5 made per game)
 Colby Rogers, Siena (73–170 .4294): 8th
 George Papas, Monmouth (103–292 .3532): 85th

Three-point Field Goals Made Per Game
 George Papas, Monmouth (3.03/game): 20th
 Colby Rogers, Siena (2.61/game): 66th

Three-Point Field Goals Made
 George Papas, Monmouth (103): 15th

Three-Point Field Goals Attempted
 George Papas, Monmouth (292): 7th

Team statistic rankings
(Thru games of March 15, 2022)

Team statistic NCAA Top 100 leaders
*Final 2021–22*

Scoring
 Iona (75.2/game): 65th

Defense
 Saint Peter's (61.8/game): 19th
 Niagara (65.5/game): 65th
 Fairfield (66.0/game): 81st

Rebounding
 Rider (37.06/game): 79th
 Iona (36.97/game): 83rd
 Monmouth (36.50/game): 100th

Total Rebounds
 Monmouth (1241): 62nd
 Rider (1223): 83rd
 Iona (1220): 85th
 Saint Peter's (1218): 89th

Offensive Rebounds
 Iona (11.42/game): 70th
 Canisius (11.12/game): 88th

Assists
 Iona (16.2/game): 17th
 Quinnipiac (14.4/game): 79th

Total Assists
 Iona (533): 24th

Assist-Turnover ratio
 Iona (1.28): 47th

Blocked Shots
 Iona (6.0/game): 3rd
 Saint Peter's (5.0/game): 21st
 Siena (4.0/game): 79th

Total Blocks
 Iona (199): 5th
 Saint Peter's (170): 17th

Field Goal Percentage Defense
 Saint Peter's (.3859): 9th
 Monmouth (.4074): 41st
 Marist (.4150): 80th
 Niagara (.4155): 84th
 Rider (.4156): 85th
 Iona (.4157): 87th

Three-Point Attempts
 Quinnipiac (801): 70th

Three-Point Percentage
 Siena (.3557): 72nd

Free Throw Percentage
 Quinnipiac (.7654): 22nd

Scoring Margin
 Iona (6.6): 72nd

Rebound Margin
 Saint Peter's (3.1): 92nd

References

External links
MAAC website